This is a list of Canadian films which were released in 1989:

See also
 1989 in Canada
 1989 in Canadian television

1989
1989 in Canadian cinema
Canada